Orange man may refer to:
Orangeman or Orangemen, members of the Orange Order, a Northern Irish Protestant organisation
Orange Man (advertisement), television advertisement of the Tango soft drink in the U.K.
"Orange man bad", a phrase used to mock criticisms of former President Donald Trump which are seen by his supporters to be unreasonable.
A man from any place named Orange
Orangemen, the former nickname for the Syracuse University Orange athletic teams